Rozumice  (German Rösnitz) is a village in the community of Gmina Kietrz, within Głubczyce County, Opole Voivodeship, in south-western Poland, close to the Czech border. The village has a population of 332.

Early history 

Though as yet undocumented  there is evidence from stone-age and bronze-age tools found locally of a settlement here from at least since the stone-age. The latest archaeological finds confirm that there has been a settlement in Rozumice since the latest palaeolithic phase. Oral history has it that a Slavic settlement of just two houses previously existed. Then King Ottokar II of Bohemia encouraged skilled German immigrants to settle in this region, overseen by the Prämostratenser of the Order of Canons Regular of Prémontré. It is probable that Rösnitz was settled around 1250, along with a neighbouring village of Pilszcz (Piltsch) that shares close physical characteristics. The first documented evidence of Rösnitz dates from 1335 (then called Resenitz), when a five-year rent free lease of farmland was granted. Comparisons of culture and dialect suggests that these first early settlers were from Franconia. Around 1432 Rösnitz came under Bohemian control, for a brief period, when the German language was replaced with Czech as the official language (though the villagers never gave up their German language) and the village renamed Rosumicz. John II, Duke of Schleswig-Holstein-Sonderburg in a document signs over the village to Johan von Woustow, evidence that the village is then under the sovereign’s control and domain. The original German settler surnames of Kremser, Proske, Krömer, Alscher, Grittner, Lamche, Weicht, Kolbe, Heidrich, Schindler, Klose survive from before this time, despite being at times under Austrian, Czech, Polish or Prussian rule, and continued to dominate life in the village up until ethnic cleansing of the village in 1946.

Village history 
The significant step in the village history was in 1526 when, according to oral history, the village became Protestant, encouraged by connections with the austere founding monastery. In 1523 the principality of Jägerndorf, under the House of Hohenzollern, which includes the village, was bought by  George, Margrave of Brandenburg-Ansbach, also a zealous Lutheran. From 1557 onwards the community bought the title deeds for their houses, the land they farmed and finally freed themselves from serfdom and most tithes. A new replacement church was built. With the ascension of Ferdinand II, Holy Roman Emperor in 1617 and the resurgence of the Roman Catholic faith in the region, the village soon became embroiled in a long period of war, which was to rage with bitter disputes and retributions for 30 years. This state of affairs went on right up to World War I. The Protestant church was locked in 1628. In the Leobschütz area during the succeeding period, only two villages, Rösnitz and Steuberwitz, were not converted back to Catholicism, at some considerable personal cost. The villagers were subjected to extreme pressures over a long period to convert back, but managed to withstand and remain Protestant. In 1671 the Catholic Church appointed a Jesuit missionary. The community still held out, holding their secret services in the woodland. with the church remaining locked to them. At the end of the Silesian Wars the village came under the rule of Prussia. In a document signed and sealed by Frederick II of Prussia the villagers’ freedoms were confirmed in 1743 and permission granted for a chapel. The chapel was built in 1747. 
The earliest documented record of a school in the village dates from 1575  with records of succeeding schoolmasters. From around 1700 to 1742 the Protestant school was closed. There are no known records of this period about the Catholic schoolmasters as none of the village children attended. In 1742 Protestant school tuition was once again permitted, the old school was pulled down and classes held in one of the houses until 1804, when it was transferred to the vacated house of the preacher, and various extensions were made in 1860. A second school building was erected in 1880, and a third teacher appointed.
The village began to prosper and become known as the richest village in the county. A great many improvements undertaken, post office 1891, telegraph 1892, slate replacing thatched roofs around the same time, roads cobbled 1896-99, piped water 1899, electricity 1923, fire hydrants and volunteer fire service 1932, motorised mills replacing the old water and two windmills, and even a swimming pool and cinema.
With border re-alignments following World War I the villagers were given a vote in 1921 whether to remain German or join Poland and the district decisively choose to remain with Germany. In 1939 there were 1060 inhabitants, and there were three shops, three bakeries, two butchers and a pub.

Architectural form 
The village was laid out in an elongated ring with a stream along its centre axis

The farm houses were located on the outer edge, the centre ground was originally left empty but eventually the artisans, shops and school took over this inner area. 
The main farmhouse gable faced onto the main road and the run of main buildings formed one side of an enclosed courtyard that was accessed through a main gate onto the street (see sketch layout). The family rooms faced the street, then horse, then cow stabling. The animals were stalled all year, too dry in summer to graze and snow bound over winter. At the far end of the courtyard were the hay barns and the bake-house. Originally used for retting the flax but when the flax industry declined and there was a change over to barley production (much prized by the brewing industry) they became the family bakehouse. Bread and cake baking for special occasions still used the village bakery. These family bakehouses were impractical and uneconomic for a family, and by World War II only some 20 were left. On the opposite side to the main farmhouse was the dowager’s house with pig sty and poultry beyond. Contrary to local traditions elsewhere the Laimes (grain stores) were positioned outside of the courtyard on the opposite side of the main street, or sometimes in the orchard.
Unusually houses were known by their 17th-century (if not older) names and not, because of recurrences of the same surnames, by the current owner. Farms were passed down to the younger son, who then had to make proportionate payment or dowry to other siblings. Around 1877–82 the patchwork pattern of fields was re-divided and each farmer had his land close together. The smaller farmers were known as ‘cow-farmers’ and the small holdings as ‘gardeners’.

Church bells 

About 1450 the 4-ton bell was cast; this became known later as the 'middle bell'. The casting date for the -ton 'small bell' is unknown, but it was thought to be very old. The earlier church was expanded in 1580 and the 'middle bell' was re-hung in it. In 1634 the 9-ton bell was cast and hung in the bell tower. At the time (and until 1800) the villagers were locked out of their church and could only gather around the bell tower. In 1807 the three bells were hung in the new church. During World War I, when metal had to be surrendered to help the war effort, the bells were spared due to their historic value, and in World War II the largest bell was left, as it was too heavy to move. The other bells were taken (to the Hamburg bell cemetery). The large bell fell and cracked during the bombing. It was later recovered, repaired and held by the village Steuberwitz, but it does not ring true. The middle bell was later discovered on loan to Murrhardt (Württemberg) and in 1978 was hung in Nikolaikirche, Vorhelm.

Century of refugees
With the 1st Ukrainian Front advances on Upper Silesia under Marshal Ivan Konev getting ever closer, on 24 March 1945 at 10:00 pm the villagers left their village with their possessions piled on horse-drawn wagons. Over some six weeks they moved west until turned around and made to return. After they left, fierce fighting went on in and around Rösnitz for a while, the church was bombed  and many of the houses were destroyed, possession of the village changed four times, leaving behind 50 disabled tanks when a general surrender was declared on 8 May. On their return the villagers were made to clear up the aftermath of the fighting. Two months later Poles from Eastern Galicia were re-settled in the village, and the villagers had to vacate their homes to make way for them, work and harvest the fields under their directions. Between 5 and 14 July 1946, under the Allied Forces directive, the original German villagers were deported to the west with no more than 50 kg of food and possessions apiece. Thus came the final end of a 420-year battle to remain true to the Protestant faith, to be supplanted by the new Roman Catholic occupants.

Present day
Polish and Ukrainian expellees from the Kresy regions of interwar Poland which had been annexed by the Soviet Union were settled here and the village renamed to Rozumice. The present Polish villagers keep in close contact with the former German speaking residents, who have been visiting the village regularly since the late 1980s and the fall of communism in Poland. Although initially the former German residents were wary of visiting the village they were won over by the hospitality of the Poles.

The German community publishes a newsletter in Germany on the life of the village in its past and present. A cooperative effort by both the former and present inhabitants of the place has resulted in a joint proposal for a Polish-German Museum on the history of the village. The president of Poland Lech Kaczyński sent a letter supporting the proposal and congratulating them on their important role in furthering friendly Polish-German relationships.

Notable residents
 Martin Fiebig (1891–1947), Luftwaffe general

Places of interest
 Ruins of Protestant church opened 1807, destroyed World War II.
 Sole surviving Laimes, renovation to be planned.
 Monument to the Fallen – WWI
 Archaeological finds from Lower Palaeolithic period.
 Forest pulpit of secret Protestant worship
 Rozumice Nature Reserve
 Mount of Gypsum – Nature Reserve

References

Rozumice